Bariura Old Bridge or Hatirpool is one of the ancient bridges in Sarail Upazila of Brahmanbaria District, and is located  north of Brahmanbaria.

It was built during Mughal Empire at Bariura, adjacent to the Dhaka-Sylhet highway.

Construction
Brick, lime and concrete based old bridge built in 16th-century to connect the land of Sarail and Shahbajpur.

History
The Bariura Bridge was built by Dewan Shahbaz Khan during his time in office in 1650. The bridge was built over the canal mainly for elephants to pass and it was therefore known as "Elephant's Bridge". The Dewans used to travel by the elephant along this road and also took rest near this bridge.

The Bridge was deserted for a long time and covered by brush. Today, the canal flow has been changed by Bangladesh Road Transport Corporation (BRTC) in the south to save the bridge by founding a modern bridge near the spot.

The old Bridge is now under care of the Bangladesh Department of Archaeology.

Gallery

See also
 List of archaeological sites in Bangladesh

References

Bridges in Bangladesh
Buildings and structures in Chittagong Division
Brahmanbaria District
History of Chittagong Division
16th-century architecture
Mughal architecture
Archaeological sites in Brahmanbaria district